Turksat may refer to:

 Türksat (company)
 Türksat (satellite)